Fat saturation may refer to:
Saturated and unsaturated compounds of fatty acids
Saturated fat
Unsaturated fat
"Fat sat", a technical sequence for fat suppression in MRI imaging